The Smolensk Kremlin is a fortified complex (kremlin) enclosing the center of the city of Smolensk in western Russia. The partially preserved fortress wall was built between 1595 and 1602, during the reign of Tsars Fyodor I Ioannovich and Boris Godunov. The fortifications were built under the supervision of the architect Fyodor Kon. The Smolensk Kremlin is classified as an architectural monument protected at the federal level, and also has a great historical significance, in particular, as the fortress protecting the Russian state from the west over centuries.

History 

Smolensk historically had a great significance for the defence of Russia, and this is why Russian rulers paid considerable attention to its fortifications. In the spring of 1554, Tsar Ivan the Terrible ordered to build a new tall wooden fortress. After the development of artillery, it became clear that a wooden fortress was no longer suitable for the defense, and at the end of the 16th century, it was decided to build a new stone fortress at the place of the old one.

In December 1595, the preparations for the construction started after the official decree was issued. The construction works were very intense and were performed daily from sunrise to sunset. The construction workers, however, lived in harsh conditions and revolted in 1599 because of hunger, cold, and diseases. In the summer of 1597 long and heavy rains flooded all the trenches and ditches, and the construction workers had to strengthen the landslide soil by piles. In 1600, because of the heat and heavy rains, a large number of crops was lost in Russia, causing a famine.

The construction of the new fortress used the old existing fortifications, in some places the new wall was built on top of them, and in certain areas, the new fortress extended beyond the limits set by the old one. 
The construction started from the western side of the fortress.

Towers and walls

Several sections of the wall survived, the eastern section with nine towers, the south-western section with five towers, and the northern section with three towers.

The most famous remaining tower is the round-cornered tower named Veselukha. This name was given to it because of the nice view which opens from the tower. In the daytime, citizens lead their guests to see the beautiful suburbs.  However, in the evening time and especially during the night it is a rather dangerous place and has a bad reputation.  Brave hearts who dare to appear at this place told about horror phantoms and ghosts. Finally it was found the reasonable explanation to that awful fact. This place was used by the counterfeiters who printed out false money and scared people who tried to walk around.

The Main Gate Tower was Frolovskaya (Dnieper Tower), through which was the exit to the capital of the Russian state. The second most important was Molohovskaya tower, opens the way to Kiev, Krasny and Roslavl.

Remaining towers
 
Pyatnitskaya (Water Tower)
Volkova
Kostyrevskaya (Red Tower)
Veselukha (Luchinskaya)
Pozdnyakova (Rogovka)
Oryol (Gorogetskaya)
Avraamievskaya 
Zaaltarnaya (Belukha)
Voronina
Dolgochevskaya
Zimbulka 
Nikolskaya 
Mokhovaya
Donets 
Gromovaya 
Bubleika 
Kopytenskaya

Destroyed towers
Antifonovskaya
Bogoslovskaya
Ivorovskaya (Verzhenova)
Pyatnitsa (Water Gate)
Granovitaya (Faceted Tower)
Gurkina
Frolovskaya
Evstafevskaya (Brikareva)
Kassandalovskaya (Kozodavlevskaya, Artishevskaya)
2 unnamed round towers
Krylosh Gate
Lazarev Gate
Molokhov Gate
Mikulinskaya
Stefanskaya
Kolominskaya (Sheinova)
Gorodetskaya (Semenovskaya)
3 unnamed quadrangular towers

References

External links 

Fortifications of Smolensk 

Kremlins
Buildings and structures in Smolensk
Buildings and structures in Smolensk Oblast
Tourist attractions in Smolensk Oblast
Cultural heritage monuments of federal significance in Smolensk Oblast